Fred Gilby (11 June 1907 – 11 June 1991) was an Australian rules footballer who played for Carlton in the Victorian Football League (VFL).

Gilby, a half back flanker, played at Coburg in 1925 when they were in their first VFA season. He joined Carlton the following year and was a regular in the team for over a decade. Gilby played 12 finals during his career and appeared in the 1932 VFL Grand Final, which Carlton lost to Richmond.

References

External links

Holmesby, Russell and Main, Jim (2007). The Encyclopedia of AFL Footballers. 7th ed. Melbourne: Bas Publishing.

1907 births
Carlton Football Club players
Coburg Football Club players
Australian rules footballers from Victoria (Australia)
1991 deaths